Silvester Knipfer (20 December 1939 – 29 November 2010) was a German sports shooter. He competed in the 50 metre rifle, prone event at the 1972 Summer Olympics for West Germany.

References

1939 births
2010 deaths
German male sport shooters
Olympic shooters of West Germany
Shooters at the 1972 Summer Olympics
Sportspeople from Munich